John Arthur Watkins  (born 7 December 1955) is a former Deputy Premier of New South Wales, serving between 2005 until his resignation from Parliament in 2008. Watkins has been the Chief Executive Officer of Alzheimer's Australia (NSW) since 2008; the Chairman of Calvary healthcare since 2011; and the eighth Chancellor of the University of New England, serving between 2013 and 2014.

Watkins was an elected as a member of the New South Wales Legislative Assembly representing the electorates of Gladesville (between 1995 and 1999) and then Ryde (between 1999 and 2008) for the Labor Party. During his parliamentary career, Watkins served in a range of ministerial portfolios including Fair Trading, Sport and Recreation, Police and Corrective Services, Transport, Finance, State Development, and Education and Training. Often touted as a possible Labor premier, Watkins was from the minority Labor Left faction.

Early years and background
Watkins is married to Deborah and together they have five children. He holds a Bachelor of Laws degree, a Master of Arts degree and a Diploma of Education. Prior to becoming a politician, Watkins was a school teacher at St. Joseph's College, Hunters Hill.

Watkins was a former Alderman on Hunters Hill Municipal Council from 1987 to 1991, and held the position of Deputy Mayor.

Political career
Watkins was an elected as a member of the New South Wales Legislative Assembly representing the electorate of Gladesville in the 1995 election for the Labor Party. Gladesville was abolished in the 1999 election and Watkins contested and won the new seat of Ryde in the election.

Watkins was appointed Minister for Fair Trading and Sports (1999–2001),  Minister for Education (2001–2003) and Minister for Police (2003–2005). Watkins was appointed Deputy Premier in August 2005, following the resignation of Andrew Refshauge and upon the appointment of Morris Iemma as Premier. Watkins held the cabinet position of Transport Minister from January 2005.  He was appointed Minister for Finance on 30 March 2007 following the reelection of the Iemma Government. Watkins resigned from Cabinet and retired from Parliament in 2008, saying that he had been unable to balance work and family. His retirement triggered the unintentional downfall of Premier Morris Iemma three days later.  His resignation came at a bad time for the government; its polling numbers were in free fall only a year after winning reelection.  In the ensuing by-election, Ryde was resoundingly lost to Liberal Victor Dominello on a swing of 23.7 percent; only a year earlier, Watkins had been reelected with 60 percent of the two-party vote.

Post politics
In 2008 Watkins was appointed as Chief Executive Officer of Alzheimer's Australia (NSW); after serving as a board member in 2011 he was appointed Chairman of Calvary (Little Company of Mary Healthcare); and in April 2013, he was appointed to succeed Richard Torbay as the eighth Chancellor of the University of New England, until his resignation in June 2014.

In 2017 he was approached to run as the ALP candidate for the federal Bennelong by-election, as Bennelong encompasses his old state seat of Ryde, but declined after former premier Kristina Keneally informed him that she wanted to run in the by-election.

Keneally duly became the candidate but was not successful at the by-election.

References

External links
Inaugural speech to the Legislative Assembly – Hansard. 17 October 1995

1955 births
Living people
Deputy Premiers of New South Wales
Labor Left politicians
Members of the New South Wales Legislative Assembly
Members of the Order of Australia
People educated at St Pius X College, Sydney
Chancellors of the University of New England (Australia)
Australian Labor Party members of the Parliament of New South Wales
20th-century Australian politicians
21st-century Australian politicians